Carum is a genus of about 20 species of flowering plants in the family Apiaceae, native to temperate regions of the Old World. Two of the best recognized species are caraway (C. carvi), the seeds of which are widely used as a spice, and ajwain (Carum copticum). In the Mongolian flora (adjunctive by Urgamal M., 2012) is two species (C. carve L., C. buriaticum Turcz.) belong to the genus Carum. 

Carum bulbocastanum is nowadays placed in Bunium and usually synonymized with Bunium persicum.

References

External links 
 
 

 
Apioideae genera